Nausodis eldership is an eldership in Plungė District Municipality, Lithuania. It is located to the southwest from Plungė. The administrative center is Varkaliai.

Largest towns and villages 
Varkaliai
Prūsaliai
Kaušėnai
Karklėnai
Stonaičiai
Vieštovėnai
Juodeikiai

Other villages

References 

Elderships in Plungė District Municipality